The 2019–20 Detroit Pistons season was the 79th season of the franchise, the 72nd in the National Basketball Association (NBA), and the third in Midtown Detroit. This was the second season under head coach Dwane Casey. 

On March 11, 2020, the season was suspended by the NBA due to the COVID-19 pandemic after it was reported Rudy Gobert tested positive. On June 4, 2020, the season came to an end for the Pistons when the NBA Board of Governors approved a plan that would restart the season with 22 teams returning to play in the  NBA Bubble on July 31, 2020, which was approved by the National Basketball Players Association the next day.

Draft picks

The Pistons held two first round picks and one second round pick entering the draft. The 30th pick was traded to the Cleveland Cavaliers, while the 45th pick was traded to the Dallas Mavericks in exchange for the 37th pick. They acquired the 57th pick from the Philadelphia 76ers.

Roster

Standings

Division

Conference

Game log

Preseason

|-style="background:#fcc;"
| 1
| October 7
| Orlando
| 
| Christian Wood (19)
| Andre Drummond (9)
| Blake Griffin (5)
| Little Caesars Arena7,411
| 0–1
|- style="background:#bfb;"
| 2
| October 9
| Dallas
| 
| Luke Kennard (19)
| Andre Drummond (9)
| Jackson & Rose (5)
| Little Caesars Arena9,695
| 1–1
|- style="background:#bfb;"
| 3
| October 11
| Cleveland
| 
| Brown, Drummond, Jackson & Rose (15)
| Thon Maker (10)
| Bruce Brown Jr. (7)
| Little Caesars Arena13,925
| 2–1
|- style="background:#fcc;"
| 4
| October 15
| @ Philadelphia
| 
| Christian Wood (19)
| Maker & Wood (10)
| Thon Maker (5)
| Wells Fargo Center14,317
| 2–2
|- style="background:#bfb;"
| 5
| October 16
| @ Charlotte
| 
| Langston Galloway (18)
| Andre Drummond (12)
| Tim Frazier (15)
| Spectrum Center7,746
| 3–2
|-

Regular season

|- style="background:#cfc;"
| 1
| October 23
| @ Indiana
| 
| Andre Drummond (32)
| Andre Drummond (23)
| Derrick Rose (9)
| Bankers Life Fieldhouse17,923
| 1–0
|- style="background:#fcc;"
| 2
| October 24
| Atlanta
| 
| Derrick Rose (27)
| Andre Drummond (12)
| Jackson, Rose, Galloway & Kennard (3)
| Little Caesars Arena20,332
| 1–1
|- style="background:#fcc;"
| 3
| October 26
| Philadelphia
| 
| Derrick Rose (31)
| Andre Drummond (12)
| Tony Snell (6)
| Little Caesars Arena16,207
| 1–2
|- style="background:#cfc;"
| 4
| October 28
| Indiana
| 
| Christian Wood (19)
| Andre Drummond (18)
| Tim Frazier (8)
| Little Caesars Arena13,565
| 2–2
|- style="background:#fcc;"
| 5
| October 30
| @ Toronto
| 
| Andre Drummond (21)
| Andre Drummond (22)
| Derrick Rose (10)
| Scotiabank Arena19,800
| 2–3

|- style="background:#fcc;"
| 6
| November 1
| @ Chicago
| 
| Andre Drummond (25)
| Andre Drummond (23)
| Derrick Rose (7)
| United Center20,671
| 2–4
|- style="background:#cfc;"
| 7
| November 2
| Brooklyn
| 
| Andre Drummond (25)
| Andre Drummond (20)
| Bruce Brown Jr. (7)
| Little Caesars Arena17,222
| 3–4
|- style="background:#fcc;"
| 8
| November 4
| @ Washington
| 
| Luke Kennard (24)
| Andre Drummond (24)
| Bruce Brown Jr. (7)
| Capital One Arena13,052
| 3–5
|- style="background:#cfc;"
| 9
| November 6
| New York
| 
| Andre Drummond (27)
| Andre Drummond (12)
| Drummond & Kennard (7)
| Little Caesars Arena15,463
| 4–5
|- style="background:#fcc;"
| 10
| November 8
| @ Indiana
| 
| Luke Kennard (29)
| Andre Drummond (13)
| Andre Drummond (8)
| Bankers Life Fieldhouse15,544
| 4–6
|- style="background:#fcc;"
| 11
| November 11
| Minnesota
| 
| Luke Kennard (25)
| Andre Drummond (12)
| Griffin & Rose (5)
| Little Caesars Arena12,526
| 4–7
|- style="background:#fcc;"
| 12
| November 12
| @ Miami
| 
| Luke Kennard (22)
| Andre Drummond (9)
| Bruce Brown Jr. (11)
| American Airlines Arena19,600
| 4–8
|- style="background:#fcc;"
| 13
| November 15
| @ Charlotte
| 
| Langston Galloway (32)
| Andre Drummond (20)
| Bruce Brown Jr. (7)
| Spectrum Center16,778
| 4–9
|- style="background:#fcc;"
| 14
| November 20
| @ Chicago
| 
| Derrick Rose (18)
| Andre Drummond (14)
| Bruce Brown Jr. (6)
| United Center18,119
| 4–10
|- style="background:#cfc;"
| 15
| November 22
| Atlanta
| 
| Blake Griffin (24)
| Andre Drummond (15)
| Luke Kennard (9)
| Little Caesars Arena15,399
| 5–10
|- style="background:#fcc;"
| 16
| November 23
| @ Milwaukee
| 
| Derrick Rose (20)
| Andre Drummond (17)
| Derrick Rose (6)
| Fiserv Forum17,585
| 5–11
|- style="background:#cfc;"
| 17
| November 25
| Orlando
| 
| Luke Kennard (20)
| Andre Drummond (18)
| Luke Kennard (7)
| Little Caesars Arena14,695
| 6–11
|- style="background:#fcc;"
| 18
| November 27
| @ Charlotte
| 
| Blake Griffin (26)
| Andre Drummond (21)
| Derrick Rose (8)
| Spectrum Center15,535
| 6–12
|- style="background:#fcc;"
| 19
| November 29
| Charlotte
| 
| Derrick Rose (23)
| Andre Drummond (19)
| Bruce Brown Jr. (5)
| Little Caesars Arena15,006
| 6–13

|- style="background:#cfc;"
| 20
| December 1
| San Antonio
| 
| Christian Wood (28)
| Andre Drummond (16)
| Derrick Rose (10)
| Little Caesars Arena14,270
| 7–13
|- style="background:#cfc;"
| 21
| December 3
| @ Cleveland
| 
| Blake Griffin (24)
| Andre Drummond (14)
| Derrick Rose (9)
| Rocket Mortgage FieldHouse17,504
| 8–13
|- style="background:#fcc;"
| 22
| December 4
| Milwaukee
| 
| Andre Drummond (23)
| Andre Drummond (14)
| Drummond & Rose (5)
| Little Caesars Arena15,742
| 8–14
|- style="background:#cfc;"
| 23
| December 6
| Indiana
| 
| Drummond & Griffin (25)
| Andre Drummond (22)
| Bruce Brown Jr. (6)
| Little Caesars Arena14,894
| 9–14
|- style="background:#cfc;"
| 24
| December 9
| @ New Orleans
| 
| Derrick Rose (21)
| Andre Drummond (10)
| Derrick Rose (7)
| Smoothie King Center13,694
| 10–14
|- style="background:#fcc;"
| 25
| December 12
| Dallas
| 
| Andre Drummond (23)
| Andre Drummond (15)
| Blake Griffin (5)
| Mexico City Arena20,064
| 10–15
|- style="background:#cfc;"
| 26
| December 14
| @ Houston
| 
| Luke Kennard (22)
| Christian Wood (13)
| Derrick Rose (12)
| Toyota Center18,055
| 11–15
|- style="background:#fcc;"
| 27
| December 16
| Washington
| 
| Morris & Rose (22)
| Brown Jr., Kennard, Rose & Wood (6)
| Derrick Rose (8)
| Little Caesars Arena14,632
| 11–16
|- style="background:#fcc;"
| 28
| December 18
| Toronto
| 
| Andre Drummond (22)
| Andre Drummond (18)
| Derrick Rose (5)
| Little Caesars Arena15,319
| 11–17
|- style="background:#fcc;"
| 29
| December 20
| @ Boston
| 
| Thon Maker (15)
| Andre Drummond (11)
| Brown & Frazier (5)
| TD Garden19,156
| 11–18
|- style="background:#fcc;"
| 30
| December 21
| Chicago
| 
| Markieff Morris (23)
| Andre Drummond (14)
| Tim Frazier (9)
| Little Caesars Arena15,948
| 11–19
|- style="background:#fcc;"
| 31
| December 23
| Philadelphia
| 
| Andre Drummond (27)
| Andre Drummond (9)
| Derrick Rose (7)
| Little Caesars Arena16,476
| 11–20
|- style="background:#cfc;"
| 32
| December 26
| Washington
| 
| Christian Wood (22)
| Blake Griffin (11)
| Frazier & Rose (6)
| Little Caesars Arena17,188
| 12–20
|- style="background:#fcc;"
| 33
| December 28
| @ San Antonio
| 
| Derrick Rose (24)
| Andre Drummond (18) 
| Frazier & Rose (4)
| AT&T Center18,524
| 12–21
|- style="background:#fcc;"
| 34
| December 30
| @ Utah
| 
| Derrick Rose (20)
| Andre Drummond (13) 
| Derrick Rose (4)
| Vivint Smart Home Arena18,306
| 12–22

|- style="background:#fcc;"
| 35
| January 2
| @ L. A. Clippers
| 
| Bruce Brown Jr. (15)
| Andre Drummond (12)
| Brown & Rose (6)
| Staples Center19,068
| 12–23
|- style="background:#cfc;"
| 36
| January 4
| @ Golden State
| 
| Derrick Rose (22)
| Andre Drummond (18)
| Tim Frazier (5)
| Chase Center18,064
| 13–23
|- style="background:#fcc;"
| 37
| January 5
| @ L. A. Lakers
| 
| Derrick Rose (28)
| Andre Drummond (18)
| Brown & Rose (5)
| Staples Center18,997
| 13–24
|- style="background:#cfc;"
| 38
| January 7
| @ Cleveland
| 
| Derrick Rose (24)
| Andre Drummond (20)
| Brown & Rose (7)
| Rocket Mortgage FieldHouse17,274
| 14–24
|- style="background:#fcc;"
| 39
| January 9
| Cleveland
| 
| Andre Drummond (28)
| Andre Drummond (23)
| Bruce Brown Jr. (8)
| Little Caesars Arena13,445
| 14–25
|- style="background:#fcc;"
| 40
| January 11
| Chicago
| 
| Derrick Rose (20)
| Christian Wood (14)
| Derrick Rose (7)
| Little Caesars Arena15,951
| 14–26
|- style="background:#fcc;"
| 41
| January 13
| New Orleans
| 
| Derrick Rose (23)
| Andre Drummond (10)
| Derrick Rose (8)
| Little Caesars Arena13,780
| 14–27
|- style="background:#cfc;"
| 42
| January 15
| @ Boston
| 
| Sekou Doumbouya (24)
| Andre Drummond (13) 
| Andre Drummond (7)
| TD Garden19,156
| 15–27
|- style="background:#cfc;"
| 43
| January 18
| @ Atlanta
| 
| Derrick Rose (27)
| Andre Drummond (17)
| Derrick Rose (9)
| State Farm Arena17,056
| 16–27
|- style="background:#fcc;"
| 44
| January 20
| @ Washington
| 
| Derrick Rose (21)
| Andre Drummond (16)
| Brown & Galloway (4)
| Capital One Arena17,305
| 16–28
|- style="background:#cfc;"
| 45
| January 22
| Sacramento
| 
| Christian Wood (23)
| Markieff Morris (11)
| Derrick Rose (11)
| Little Caesars Arena13,972
| 17–28
|- style="background:#fcc;"
| 46
| January 24
| Memphis
| 
| Derrick Rose (22)
| Thon Maker (8)
| Derrick Rose (8)
| Little Caesars Arena14,583
| 17–29
|- style="background:#fcc;"
| 47
| January 25
| Brooklyn
| 
| Derrick Rose (27)
| Andre Drummond (21)
| Derrick Rose (6)
| Little Caesars Arena15,890
| 17–30
|- style="background:#fcc;"
| 48
| January 27
| Cleveland
| 
| Reggie Jackson (16)
| Andre Drummond (8)
| Bruce Brown Jr. (6)
| Little Caesars Arena12,597
| 17–31
|- style="background:#fcc;"
| 49
| January 29
| @ Brooklyn
| 
| Reggie Jackson (23)
| Andre Drummond (13)
| Rose & Jackson (5)
| Barclays Center14,275
| 17–32
|- style="background:#fcc;"
| 50
| January 31
| Toronto
| 
| Derrick Rose (21)
| Andre Drummond (20)
| Tony Snell (4)
| Little Caesars Arena17,356
| 17–33

|- style="background:#cfc;"
| 51
| February 2
| Denver
| 
| Andre Drummond (21)
| Andre Drummond (17)
| Bruce Brown Jr. (8)
| Little Caesars Arena15,488
| 18–33
|- style="background:#fcc;"
| 52
| February 3
| @ Memphis
| 
| Andre Drummond (25)
| Andre Drummond (18)
| Brown, Drummond, Jackson & Snell (4)
| FedExForum14,597
| 18–34
|- style="background:#cfc;"
| 53
| February 5
| Phoenix
| 
| Andre Drummond (31)
| Andre Drummond (19)
| Reggie Jackson (9)
| Little Caesars Arena13,707
| 19–34
|- style="background:#fcc;"
| 54
| February 7
| @ Oklahoma City
| 
| Reggie Jackson (28)
| Christian Wood (12)
| Snell & Wood (5)
| Chesapeake Energy Arena18,203
| 19–35
|- style="background:#fcc;"
| 55
| February 8
| New York
| 
| Reggie Jackson (20)
| Christian Wood (11)
| Reggie Jackson (9)
| Little Caesars Arena15,980
| 19–36
|- style="background:#fcc;"
| 56
| February 10
| Charlotte
| 
| Thon Maker (12)
| Thon Maker (12)
| Bruce Brown Jr. (5)
| Little Caesars Arena13,941
| 19–37
|- style="background:#fcc;"
| 57
| February 12
| @ Orlando
| 
| Christian Wood (26)
| Christian Wood (12)
| Reggie Jackson (11)
| Amway Center16,607
| 19–38
|- align="center"
|colspan="9" bgcolor="#bbcaff"|All-Star Break
|- style="background:#fcc;"
| 58
| February 20
| Milwaukee
| 
| Christian Wood (18)
| Christian Wood (11)
| Bruce Brown Jr. (7)
| Little Caesars Arena16,097
| 19–39
|- style="background:#fcc;"
| 59
| February 23
| @ Portland
| 
| Christian Wood (26)
| Bruce Brown Jr. (10)
| Langston Galloway (4)
| Moda Center19,393
| 19–40
|- style="background:#fcc;"
| 60
| February 25
| @ Denver
| 
| Rose & Wood (20)
| Christian Wood (10)
| Tony Snell (7)
| Pepsi Center19,143
| 19–41
|- style="background:#cfc;"
| 61
| February 28
| @ Phoenix
| 
| Derrick Rose (31)
| Christian Wood (9)
| Christian Wood (5)
| Talking Stick Resort Arena17,142
| 20–41

|- style="background:#fcc;"
| 62
| March 1
| @ Sacramento
| 
| Christian Wood (20)
| Christian Wood (12)
| Brandon Knight (7)
| Golden 1 Center17,499
| 20–42
|- style="background:#fcc;"
| 63
| March 4
| Oklahoma City
| 
| Christian Wood (29)
| Christian Wood (10)
| Brandon Knight (7)
| Little Caesars Arena15,138
| 20–43
|- style="background:#fcc;"
| 64
| March 7
| Utah
| 
| Christian Wood (30)
| Christian Wood (11)
| Bruce Brown Jr. (7)
| Little Caesars Arena16,590
| 20–44
|- style="background:#fcc;"
| 65
| March 8
| @ New York
| 
| Christian Wood (22)
| Christian Wood (8)
| Bruce Brown Jr. (6)
| Madison Square Garden18,361
| 20–45
|- style="background:#fcc;"
| 66
| March 11
| @ Philadelphia
| 
| Christian Wood (32)
| Wood & McRae (7)
| Brandon Knight (6)
| Wells Fargo Center20,172
| 20–46
 
|- style="background:#;"
| 67
| March 14
| @ Toronto
|
| 
| 
| 
| Scotiabank Arena
| 
|- style="background:#;"
| 68
| March 17
| Orlando
| 
| 
| 
|
| Little Caesars Arena
| 
|- style="background:#;"
| 69
| March 20
| Golden State
| 
|
| 
| 
| Little Caesars Arena
| 
|- style="background:#;"
| 70
| March 22
| LA Lakers
| 
| 
| 
| 
| Little Caesars Arena
| 
|- style="background:#;"
| 71
| March 23
| @ Milwaukee
| 
| 
| 
| 
| Fiserv Forum
| 
|- style="background:#;"
| 72
| March 25
| Portland
|
| 
| 
| 
| Little Caesars Arena
| 
|- style="background:#;"
| 73
| March 27
| LA Clippers
|
| 
| 
| 
| Little Caesars Arena
|
|- style="background:#;"
| 74
| March 29
| Houston
|
| 
| 
|
| Little Caesars Arena
| 
|- style="background:#;"
| 75
| April 1
| @ Brooklyn
|
| 
| 
|
| Barclays Center
| 
|- style="background:#;"
| 76
| April 3
| Miami
|
| 
| 
|
| Little Caesars Arena
| 
|- style="background:#;"
| 77
| April 5
| @ Minnesota
|
| 
| 
|
| Target Center
| 
|- style="background:#;"
| 78
| April 7
| @ Atlanta
|
| 
| 
| 
| State Farm Arena
| 
|- style="background:#;"
| 79
| April 9
| @ Miami
|
| 
|
| 
| American Airlines Arena
| 
|- style="background:#;"
| 80
| April 11
| @ Dallas
|
| 
| 
| 
| American Airlines Center
|
|- style="background:#;"
| 81
| April 13
| Boston
|
| 
| 
| 
| Little Caesars Arena
|
|- style="background:#;"
| 82
| April 14
| @ New York
|
| 
|
| 
| Madison Square Garden
|

Transactions

Overview

Trades

Free agency

Additions

Subtractions

References

Detroit Pistons

Detroit Pistons seasons
Detroit Pistons
Detroit Pistons